Michael Stich was the defending champion.

Marc Rosset won the title, beating Stich 3–6, 7–6(13–11), 7–6(10–8) in the final.

Seeds

Draw

Finals

Top half

Bottom half

References

 Main Draw

1995 Gerry Weber Open